Robert James Card (1818-1888) was an Anglican priest in Ireland during the 19th-century.

Card was born in Dublin and educated at Trinity College, Dublin. He was the incumbent at Kilcommock; and Archdeacon of Ardagh from 1875 until 1883.

Notes

Alumni of Trinity College Dublin
Church of Ireland priests
19th-century Irish Anglican priests
Christian clergy from Dublin (city)
1818 births
1888 deaths
Archdeacons of Ardagh